In common law legal systems original jurisdiction of a court is the power to hear a case for the first time, as opposed to appellate jurisdiction, when a higher court has the power to review a lower court's decision.

India

In India, the Supreme Court has original, appellate and advisory jurisdiction. Its exclusive original jurisdiction extends to all cases between the Government of India and the States of India or between Government of India and states on one side and one or more states on other side or cases between different states. Original jurisdiction is related to cases directly brought to the Supreme Court. Cases that require the interpretation of the constitution or cases relating to the denial of fundamental rights are heard in the Supreme Court.  In case there is a dispute between two or more states or between the union and the states, the Supreme Court decides such cases. In addition, Article 131 of the Constitution of India grants original jurisdiction to the Supreme Court on all cases involving the enforcement of fundamental rights of citizens. It is empowered to issue directions, orders or writs, including writs like habeas corpus, mandamus, prohibition, quo warranto and certiorari to enforce them.

The appellate jurisdiction of the Supreme Court can be invoked by a certificate granted by the High Court concerned under Article 132(1), 133(1) or 134 of the Constitution in respect of any judgement, decree or final order of a High Court in both civil and criminal cases, involving substantial questions of law as to the interpretation of the Indian Constitution.

The Supreme Court has special advisory jurisdiction in matters that may specifically be referred to by the President of India under Article 143 of the Indian Constitution.

United States

Supreme Court

In the United States, courts having original jurisdiction are referred to as trial courts. In certain types of cases, the U.S. Supreme Court has original jurisdiction concurrently with lower courts. The original jurisdiction of the U.S. Supreme Court is governed by
Article III, Section 2 of the United States Constitution and Title 28 of the United States Code, section 1251. Most commonly, original jurisdiction cases involve suits between states as parties, usually over territorial or water rights disputes.

The United States Constitution defines Original Jurisdiction thus:

Federal and state courts
In the federal court system and those of most U.S. states, there are several types of trial courts. That is, there are several specialized courts with original jurisdiction over specific types of matters, and then a court with original jurisdiction over anything not reserved to more specialized courts.

Special courts
Not all "trial courts" exclusively exercise original jurisdiction. Indeed, in both the federal and most state court systems, the trial courts of "general jurisdiction" hear appeals from trial courts of limited original jurisdiction; many states call these courts "superior courts" for this reason. For example, United States district courts hear appeals from their Bankruptcy Courts (which operate as quasi-independent units of district courts but are constitutionally separate Article I tribunals). Similarly, the Law Division of the Superior Court of New Jersey hears appeals from Pittsburgh have unique systems) and from certain agencies of local (e.g., zoning board) and state governments (e.g., Pennsylvania Liquor Control Board).

See also 
 Court of first instance (disambiguation)

References

Wex
APFN 
The Original Jurisdiction of the Supreme Court

Common law legal terminology
Jurisdiction